Indrek Turi (born 30 July 1981 in Tallinn) is a retired Estonian decathlete. His coach is Andrei Nazarov.

Turi lives near Räpina in Võõpsu village, Mikitamäe Parish.

Achievements

Personal bests (outdoor)

References

External links

1981 births
Living people
Estonian decathletes
Athletes (track and field) at the 2004 Summer Olympics
Olympic athletes of Estonia
Athletes from Tallinn
Universiade medalists in athletics (track and field)
Universiade silver medalists for Estonia
Medalists at the 2003 Summer Universiade